Baharov or Bakharov (Bulgarian: Бахъров) is a Bulgarian masculine surname, its feminine counterpart is Baharova or Bakharova. Notable people with the surname include:

Vladimir Baharov (born 1992), Bulgarian footballer
Zachary Baharov (born 1980), Bulgarian actor

Bulgarian-language surnames